'''DARICAYALANI VILLAGE

It left the village of Dariçay in 1958.It is located in Dariçay in the northeast.It is 85 km to Vezirköprü and 195 km to province of Samsun. According to the 2020 census, the village has 198 inhabitants.The village was founded by Köseoglu Haci Yakup Agha from Saraycik Village in Gümüşhacıköy district of Amasya.The villagers make a living from agriculture and livestock.Rice, beans, leeks, cabbage, tomatoes, peppers, onions, apples, quinces, figs, cherries and walnuts are grown in our village.

References

Villages in Vezirköprü District